The 2009 Trinidad and Tobago Goal Shield was the inaugural season of the Lucozade Sport Goal Shield, which is a knockout tournament competition for teams in the TT Pro League. The structure of the competition not only allowed the winners and runners-up healthy purses at the end of the tournament, but more so give an added incentive for more goals to be scored throughout the tournament. In particular, the winner of the competition was awarded TT$20,000 plus an additional TT$3,000 for every goal scored in the final, TT$2,000 for every goal in the semifinals, and TT$1,000 for each goal scored in the quarterfinals. Whereas, the runner-up was awarded TT$10,000 plus TT$1,500 for every goal scored in the final, TT$1,000 for every goal in the semifinals, and TT$500 for each goal scored in the quarterfinals.

Qualification
Seeding was determined from the league standings after the fourth match day of the 2009 season. However, the teams which played four matches, their goals and points from Match Day 4 were not entered into the qualifying table to ensure that all teams start evenly. Thus, only points from three matches were considered for the draw and the clubs were drawn based on their positions.

The bottom two teams were placed in a penalty shootout to determine which team would advance to the qualifying round. Teams ranked seventh to ninth were then placed directly into the qualifying round which will determine the seventh and eight spots in the quarterfinals. Finally, the teams ranked from first to sixth automatically qualified for the quarterfinals.

The automatic quarterfinal qualifiers in order of league position were: San Juan Jabloteh, United Petrotrin, Joe Public, Caledonia AIA, W Connection, and Defence Force.

Schedule
The schedule for the 2009 Lucozade Sport Goal Shield, as announced by the TT Pro League:

Bracket

Results
All matches except the Penalty shootout were played for 90 minutes duration, at the end of which if the match was still tied, penalty-kicks were used to determine the match winner.

Penalty shootout
On 29 May, Tobago United became the first club to win two penalty shootouts on one night, when they first defeated FC South End in the penalty shootout by a score of 4–2 to advance to the qualifying round.

Qualifying round
Thirty minutes after their penalty shootout win, Tobago United faced Police in the qualifying round. The Tobago Boys picked up the unusual achievement by outscoring Police 5–3 on penalties after the match ended 0–0 in regular time.

Quarterfinals

Semifinals

Final
The competition culminated with the inaugural final, held at Manny Ramjohn Stadium, Marabella on 26 June. The match was contested by W Connection and Defence Force, with W Connection taking the title 3–0. Jonathan Faña, of Dominican Republic, scored five goals to lead the tournament and W Connection to the title.

References

External links
Official Website

2009 Lucozade Sport Goal Shield
Trinidad and Tobago Goal Shield
Goal Shield